Montclair is a neighborhood in southeastern Lexington, Kentucky, United States. Its boundaries are Providence Road to the north, Montclair Drive to the south, Tates Creek Road to the east, and the University of Kentucky to the west.

Neighborhood statistics

 Area: 
 Population: 440
 Population density: 4,159 people per square mile
 Median household income (2010): $56,383

References

Neighborhoods in Lexington, Kentucky